The Harris-Murrow-Trowell House in Screven County, Georgia was built 1889 as one of the first houses in the small village of Oliver, after Central of Georgia Railway established a stop there.  It was listed on the National Register of Historic Places in 2009.

Its NRHP nomination described it as having "local significance in the area of architecture as a good
example of a 1889 gabled wing cottage type house with an attached tenant house on the rear
elevation. According to Georgia's Living Places: Historic Houses in Their Landscaped Settings,
gabled wing cottages were built throughout Georgia primarily between 1875 and 1915 on farms and
in Georgia's towns and cities. It was a popular house type that was built throughout the state in both
modest and well-to-do parts of the state. The gabled wing cottage is either T-or L-shaped and
usually has a gabled roof. Other than the rear addition, the Harris-Murrow-Trowell House retains its
historic exterior and interior finishes and materials and has changed little since its construction."

References

Houses on the National Register of Historic Places in Georgia (U.S. state)
Houses completed in 1888
National Register of Historic Places in Screven County, Georgia